Ada Palmer (born June 9, 1981) is an American historian and writer and winner of the 2017 John W. Campbell Award for Best New Writer. Her first novel, Too Like the Lightning, was published in May 2016. The work has been well received by critics and was a finalist for the Hugo Award for Best Novel.

Early life and education
The daughter of computer engineer Douglas Palmer and artist Laura Higgins Palmer, Ada was born in Washington, D.C. but grew up in Annapolis, Maryland, where she attended The Key School. Following her undergraduate education beginning at age 15 for two years at Bard College at Simon's Rock and then transferring to Bryn Mawr College, she obtained a doctorate at Harvard University.

Academic career
Following a stint at Texas A&M University, Palmer began teaching at the University of Chicago.

As a scholar, Palmer researches and teaches about the Renaissance period. She teaches a class on the Italian Renaissance wherein students enact the 1492 papal election, complete with secret meetings, betrayals, and a final vote conducted in full costume. In an interview, Palmer discussed her experience with the class, suggesting that students have a lot of favorable biases about this period despite its darker underside.

Palmer co-authored The Recovery of Ancient Philosophy in the Renaissance: A Brief Guide with James Hankins in 2008. Her own first book, Reading Lucretius in the Renaissance, was published in 2014. Palmer holds that the Lucretius poem De rerum natura, rediscovered in the Renaissance, could be the first document offering a profane worldview; that is, the possibility to describe how the universe works without any divine influence. This theory has implications for the development of political science as well as other secular worldviews. Palmer and Hankins also argue that Lucretius' ideas directly influenced Niccolò Machiavelli and utilitarianism, because of the ways in which his theories helped them create an ethics working per se, without any external, godly influence.

Fictional work

Terra Ignota 

Palmer's first novel, Too Like the Lightning, the first of the Terra Ignota series, was published in 2016, and was a finalist for the 2017 Hugo Awards. It has been described as a rational adjacent book, a work influenced both by science-fiction and historical genres, a fact the author has confirmed. The novel won the 2017 Compton Crook Award for the best first novel in the genre published during the previous year.

The series has four novels:

 Too Like the Lightning (2016)
 Seven Surrenders (2017)
 The Will to Battle (2017)
 Perhaps the Stars (2021)

References

External links

 "Fiction and History: Narratives, Contexts and Imagination", by Ada Palmer, Jane Dailey, Ghenwa Hayek, Paola Iovene, David Perry. Chicago Journal of History, Spring 2017

1981 births
Living people
21st-century American novelists
21st-century American women writers
American women academics
American science fiction writers
Bryn Mawr College alumni
Harvard University alumni
People from Annapolis, Maryland
University of Chicago faculty
20th-century American historians
Historians of the Renaissance
John W. Campbell Award for Best New Writer winners
Novelists from Illinois
American women non-fiction writers
21st-century American non-fiction writers
20th-century American women writers
People from Washington, D.C.
Filkers
Historians from Maryland